Linha de Leixões, also known as Linha de Cintura do Porto, is a freight railway line which connects Contumil railway station, on the Linha do Minho, and Leixões, in Matosinhos, Portugal. It was opened in 1938, and electrified in 1998. Passenger services ran until 1987 and from 2009 to 2011.

See also
List of railway lines in Portugal
List of Portuguese locomotives and railcars
History of rail transport in Portugal

References

Sources

Lei
Iberian gauge railways
Railway lines opened in 1938